Avgerinos is a community located in the Tsotyli municipal unit, situated in western Kozani regional unit, in the Greek region of Macedonia.

References

Populated places in Kozani (regional unit)